The men's road race at the 1996 UCI Road World Championships was the 63rd edition of the event. The race took place on Sunday 13 October 1996 in Lugano, Switzerland. The race was won by Johan Museeuw of Belgium.

Final classification

References

Men's Road Race
UCI Road World Championships – Men's road race